Smaato is a digital ad tech platform and ad server. Smaato's self-serve omnichannel monetization solution gives publishers the ability to manage their entire ad stack in one place. Ad monetization technology lets publishers keep their content free for users.

The company was founded in 2005 by Ragnar Kruse and Petra Vorsteher. The name Smaato comes from the Japanese word for "smart."

Smaato is headquartered in San Francisco, California. There are additional offices in New York, Hamburg, Berlin, Singapore, and Shanghai, with over 190 employees from more than 40 different countries.

History
Founded in 2005, Smaato launched its mobile supply-side platform (SSP) a year after the company was formed. In 2012, Smaato launched its real-time bidding ad exchange. After, the company focused on mobile acquisition and building out the self-service side of its automation platform.

In 2015, the company released a full-featured publisher ad server, the Smaato Publisher Platform (SPX). The platform enables app developers and digital publishers to immediately monetize their properties by delivering target consumers to advertisers, based on real-time data.

The following year, Smaato was selected by Google and integrated into the AdMob and DoubleClick for Publishers platforms via SDK-less mediation. Later in 2016, Smaato further developed its products for the demand side of mobile advertising. The Smaato Demand Platform (SDX) offered demand partners greater flexibility and control over their mobile ad traffic. Smaato was sold to Beijing-based Spearhead Integrated Marketing Communication Group for $148 Million in 2016.

In 2018, the company integrated with Amazon Publisher Services (APS) to provide in-app demand partners access to Amazon's Transparent Ad Marketplace inventory.

Smaato presently focuses on deploying artificial intelligence and machine learning. In May 2018, their Automated Traffic Curation (ATC) product was reported to significantly reduce costs of programmatic bidding for demand-side platforms (DSPs). The machine learning technology filters out less relevant inventory before sending a bid request to a demand partner's platform — providing better opportunities for advertisers by saving time and expenses related to data processing.

The majority of Smaato's revenues currently come from the US, but the company expects a significant increase in the Chinese market in the coming years.

In 2021 the company launched OTT solution inside its Smaato Publisher Platform (SPX) and does Server-Side Ad Insertion in house. 

In July 2021, Smaato was acquired by Media and Games Invest. Together with Verve Group, Smaato completes the tech stack with omnichannel offerings across web, in-app, DOOH, and CTV.

See also 
 Supply-side platform

References 

Companies based in San Francisco
2005 establishments in California
Online advertising services and affiliate networks